Saddle Rock Grist Mill is a historic grist mill building located in Saddle Rock, a village in the town of North Hempstead in Nassau County, New York.  It is a -story gambrel-roofed structure. Adjacent is a stream-fed millpond that is supplemented by tidal water impounded by the dam. It dates to the 18th century and is the only extant, operating tidal grist mill on Long Island.  The building underwent restoration in the 1950s and is operated as a local history museum.

It was added to the National Register of Historic Places in 1978.

References

External links
Saddle Rock Grist Mill - Nassau County

Grinding mills on the National Register of Historic Places in New York (state)
History museums in New York (state)
Industrial buildings completed in 1850
Museums in Nassau County, New York
Mill museums in New York (state)
Grinding mills in New York (state)
National Register of Historic Places in Nassau County, New York